Hernaín Arzú Güity (born 13 October 1967) is a retired Honduran football player who made his name with the national team in the 1990s.

Club career
Arzú started his career at F.C. Motagua and played 212 matches for the club over a period of 10 years. He also played for Marathón.

International career
Arzú made his debut for Honduras in a June 1992 friendly match against Panama and has earned a total of 36 caps, scoring no goals. He has represented his country in 6 FIFA World Cup qualification matches and played at the 1995 and 1997 UNCAF Nations Cups as well as at the 1998 CONCACAF Gold Cup.

His final international was a February 1998 CONCACAF Gold Cup match against Mexico.

Honours and awards

Club
F.C. Motagua
Liga Profesional de Honduras (3):  1991–92, 1997–98 A, 1997–98 C

Country
Honduras
Copa Centroamericana (1): 1995

References

External links

 Hernaín Arzú - La Tribuna 

1967 births
Living people
Association football defenders
Honduran footballers
Honduras international footballers
1995 UNCAF Nations Cup players
1997 UNCAF Nations Cup players
1998 CONCACAF Gold Cup players
F.C. Motagua players
C.D. Marathón players
Liga Nacional de Fútbol Profesional de Honduras players
Honduran football managers
F.C. Motagua managers
Copa Centroamericana-winning players